Nils Dahl (12 November 1882 in Kristiania – 17 July 1966 in Oslo) was a Norwegian middle distance runner who specialised in the 1500 metres. He represented Kristiania IF.

In the 1500 metres at the 1908 Summer Olympics, Dahl placed seventh in his initial semifinal heat and did not advance to the final. At the 1912 Summer Olympics he participated in the individual cross country competition, but did not finish. As such, he did not place in the team cross country competition. He became Norwegian champion in 1500 metres in the years 1906-1909 and in the 5000 metres in 1908.

References

Sources

External links

1882 births
1966 deaths
Norwegian male middle-distance runners
Athletes (track and field) at the 1908 Summer Olympics
Athletes (track and field) at the 1912 Summer Olympics
Olympic athletes of Norway
Olympic cross country runners